Barry T. Hannon was a Democratic member of the Massachusetts House of Representatives and the Registrar of Deeds for Norfolk County, Massachusetts. He was from Braintree, Massachusetts.

He was often the only candidate in ten elections between 1970 and 1994.

References

Members of the Massachusetts House of Representatives
People from Braintree, Massachusetts
Year of birth missing
Possibly living people